The meridian 10° east of Greenwich is a line of longitude that extends from the North Pole across the Arctic Ocean, Europe, Africa, the Atlantic Ocean, the Southern Ocean, and Antarctica to the South Pole.

The 10th meridian east forms a great circle with the 170th meridian west.

From Pole to Pole
Starting at the North Pole and heading south to the South Pole, the 10th meridian east passes through:

{| class="wikitable plainrowheaders"
! scope="col" width="125" | Co-ordinates
! scope="col" | Country, territory or sea
! scope="col" | Notes
|-
| style="background:#b0e0e6;" | 
! scope="row" style="background:#b0e0e6;" | Arctic Ocean
| style="background:#b0e0e6;" |
|-
| style="background:#b0e0e6;" | 
! scope="row" style="background:#b0e0e6;" | Atlantic Ocean
| style="background:#b0e0e6;" |
|-valign="top"
| 
! scope="row" | 
| Entering at Stokkøya in Sør-Trøndelag. Exiting 3 km southwest of Stavern in Vestfold.
|-
| style="background:#b0e0e6;" | 
! scope="row" style="background:#b0e0e6;" | Skagerrak
| style="background:#b0e0e6;" |
|-valign="top"
| 
! scope="row" | 
| Vendsyssel-Thy island, Jutland peninsula and the islands of Funen and Als
|-
| 
! scope="row" | 
| Passing through city centre / old city of Hamburg
|-
| 
! scope="row" | 
|
|-
| 
! scope="row" | 
|
|-
| 
! scope="row" | 
|
|-valign="top"
| style="background:#b0e0e6;" | 
! scope="row" style="background:#b0e0e6;" | Mediterranean Sea
| style="background:#b0e0e6;" | Passing just east of the island of Capraia,  Passing just west of the islands of Elba and Pianosa,  Passing just east of the island of Sardinia, 
|-
| 
! scope="row" | 
|
|-
| 
! scope="row" | 
|
|-
| 
! scope="row" | 
|
|-
| 
! scope="row" | 
|
|-
| 
! scope="row" | 
|
|-
| 
! scope="row" | 
|
|-
| 
! scope="row" | 
|
|-
| 
! scope="row" | 
|
|-
| style="background:#b0e0e6;" | 
! scope="row" style="background:#b0e0e6;" | Atlantic Ocean
| style="background:#b0e0e6;" |
|-
| style="background:#b0e0e6;" | 
! scope="row" style="background:#b0e0e6;" | Southern Ocean
| style="background:#b0e0e6;" |
|-
| 
! scope="row" | Antarctica
| Queen Maud Land, claimed by 
|-
|}

Usage

In some world maps, the 10th Meridian East is used the centre (instead of Greenwich), to avoid cutting off the tip of Asia.

See also
9th meridian east
11th meridian east

e010th meridian east